Loughborough University Football Club (also known as Loughborough Students Football Club) is an English football club representing Loughborough University, based  in Loughborough, Leicestershire.

History
The club was founded in 1920 under the name Loughborough College. They joined Division Two of the Leicestershire Senior League in 1966, where they remained until 1972. The club then left Senior football, and did not return until 2007 when they were promoted to the Premier Division of the Midland Combination. In 2008–09 they won the league's Premier Division, and were promoted to the Midland Alliance. The Scholars ground shared at fellow local side Loughborough Dynamo until moving into the new Holywell Park, Loughborough University Stadium.

In 2011 the club beat Boldmere St Michaels 4–2 to lift the League Cup at Walsall's Bescot Stadium, then won the trophy again the following season when they beat Tipton Town 2–0.

Popular manager Stuart McLaren resigned from his post in 2014 after being announced as the new Stirling Albion manager. Following this, Michael Skubala was appointed as part time Performance Manager and put former Chesterfield manager John Duncan and Graham Harvey in charge of the 1st team. However they were not able to avoid the club ending in the bottom three of the Midland Football League Premier. Relegation was nonetheless avoided due to Causeway United folding at the end of the season.

For the 2015–16 season, the club turned to former Quorn AFC assistant manager and experienced non-league man Karl Brennan, in his first part time management role. Unfortunately, Brennan did not see out the season and left with the Scholars languishing at the bottom of the table.

In January 2017 Richard Allen, formally Head of Recruitment at Tottenham Hotspur, Academy Manager at QPR and more recently Head of Talent at the Football Association was appointed as the first ever Director of Football. Alex Ackerley was subsequently confirmed as full time Men's Head Coach and Mat Stock elevated from Programme Coordinator to Programme Manager.

The team managed to avoid relegation narrowly that season.

With the reorganisation of the Step 5 leagues in 2019, Loughborough Students FC were moved in to the United Counties League. Reaching the final of the Leicestershire and Rutland FA Senior Cup Final only to lose out in the final to Step 3 side Coalville Town FC

In 2021 former Leeds, Middlesbrough, Hull and Barnsley Assistant Manager and former Ipswich and Birmingham player Jamie Clapham was appointed as Men's Head Coach replacing Alex Ackerley who joined Sunderland FC to coach within their Academy set up.

In the 21-22 season the Scholars we crowned BUCS National Champions for the first time in nine years and were semi-finalists in the FA Vase (losing away to Littlehampton Town), their best ever performance in the Vase.

Notable former players
Alumni that went on to play or work in football include:
Oladapo Afolayan
Ebby Nelson-Addy
Alan Bradshaw
Tom Curtis
Greg Fee
Lee Howarth
Ray Long
Mattar M'Boge
Paul McGuinness
Leon McSweeney
Rob Matthews
Bradley Pritchard
Lawrie Sanchez
Robbie Simpson
Tony Waiters
George Williams
Bob Wilson
Dario Gradi
Barry Hines
Ted Powell
Keith Blunt
Alan Bradshaw
Chris Forino-Joseph
Aditi Chauhan

References

External links
Club website

University and college football clubs in England
Association football clubs established in 1920
F.C.
Leicestershire Senior League
Midland Football Alliance
Midland Football Combination
Football clubs in Leicestershire
1920 establishments in England
Midland Football League
Football clubs in England